Next Gen Cup or Next Generation Cup is a youth football tournament organised jointly by the Premier League and the Indian Super League (through the Reliance Foundation) as part of the Premier League Youth Games initiative.

History 
In 2019, as a part of the Premier League Youth Games initiative, youth players of Arsenal F.C. and Leicester City FC visited India to play against RFYC and Mumbai City FC youth teams.
First edition of the Next Generation Cup was organised at Reliance Coperate Park in Navi Mumbai. 6 teams took part in the competition, three Indian Super League U-15 teams and three Premier League U-14 teams.

Teams

2020 
Under-14 and under-15 tournament

2022 
Under-23 tournament

Winners

References 

Football cup competitions in India